Wakefieldite is an uncommon rare-earth element vanadate mineral. There are four main types described of wakefieldite- wakefieldite-(La), wakefieldite-(Ce), wakefieldite-(Nd), and wakefieldite-(Y), depending upon the dominant rare-earth metal ion present. Wakefieldite has a Mohs hardness ranging from 4 to 5. Wakefieldite forms crystals of tetragonal structure. In terms of crystal structure, it is the vanadate analog of the rare-earth phosphate mineral xenotime. Unlike xenotime, it is more favorable for wakefieldite to contain the lighter rare-earth elements over the heavier ones. Due to the lanthanide contraction, the heavier rare earths have smaller ionic radii than the lighter ones. When the phosphate anion is replaced by the larger vanadate anion, the tetragonal crystal system preferentially accommodates the larger light rare-earth elements.

Wakefieldite was first described for an occurrence in the Evans Lou mine, St. Pierre de Wakefield, Quebec, Canada and later designated Wakefieldite-(Y).

References

Lanthanide minerals
Vanadate minerals
Tetragonal minerals
Minerals in space group 141